The 1991 Los Angeles Rams season was the team's 55th year with the National Football League and the 46th season in Los Angeles. The team was looking to improve on its 5–11 record from 1990. However, the Rams finished the 1991 season 3–13, tied for the second worst record in the NFL with the Cincinnati Bengals and the Tampa Bay Buccaneers. After splitting their first 6 games, the Rams lost their final 10 games of the season, their longest losing streak to end a season, beating the 1937 team based in Cleveland, who lost nine in a row to end that season. The 3–13 record was the worst for the Rams in Los Angeles for a 16-game schedule and tied the third-fewest victories posted by the team during its tenure in the city. This was also, at the time, the worst record for the Rams in a 16-game schedule overall (not including the 1982 strike-shortened season).

The 1991 Rams' pass defense surrendered 7.86 yards-per-pass attempt (including quarterback sacks), the fourth-most in the history of the league.

The last remaining active member of the 1991 Los Angeles Rams was linebacker Roman Phifer, who retired after the 2005 season.

Offseason

NFL Draft

Personnel

Staff

Roster

Regular season 
In a game against the Lions, Lions offensive lineman Mike Utley suffered an injury to his sixth and seventh cervical vertebrae occurred on November 17, 1991. Utley flashed the crowd a "thumbs up" as he was being taken off the field.

Schedule

Standings

Awards and honors 
 Jim Everett, NFC Pro Bowl selection

See also 
Other Anaheim–based teams in 1991
 California Angels (Anaheim Stadium)
 1991 California Angels season

References

External links 
 1991 Los Angeles Rams at Pro-Football-Reference.com

Los Angeles Rams
Los Angeles Rams seasons
Los Ang